Helmut Kuhlmann (15 August 1940 – 20 October 2022) was a German politician.

A member of the Christian Democratic Union, he served in the Landtag of Lower Saxony from 1974 to 1998.

Kuhlmann died on 20 October 2022, at the age of 82.

References

1940 births
2022 deaths
Christian Democratic Union of Germany politicians
Members of the Landtag of Lower Saxony
Recipients of the Cross of the Order of Merit of the Federal Republic of Germany
People from Hameln-Pyrmont